South Eastern Asmara Administration is an administration in Asmara, Eritrea.

References
Administrations of Asmara

Central Region (Eritrea)
Subregions of Eritrea